The 1945 National Football League Draft was held on April 8, 1945, at the Commodore Hotel in New York City, New York. With the first overall pick of the draft, the Chicago Cardinals selected halfback Charley Trippi.

Player selections

Round one

Round two

Round three

Round four

Round five

Round six

Round seven

Round eight

Round nine

Round ten

Round eleven

Round twelve

Round thirteen

Round fourteen

Round fifteen

Round sixteen

Round seventeen

Round eighteen

Round nineteen

Round twenty

Round twenty-one

Round twenty-two

Round twenty-three

Round twenty-four

Round twenty-five

Round twenty-six

Round twenty-seven

Round twenty-eight

Round twenty-nine

Round thirty

Round thirty-one

Round thirty-two

Hall of Famers
 Charley Trippi, halfback from Georgia taken 1st round 1st overall by the Chicago Cardinals.
Inducted: Professional Football Hall of Fame class of 1968.
 Elroy “Crazylegs” Hirsch, wide receiver from Michigan taken 1st round 5th overall by the Cleveland Rams.
Inducted: Professional Football Hall of Fame class of 1968.
 Pete Pihos, defensive end from Indiana University (Bloomington) taken 5th round 41st overall by the Philadelphia Eagles.
Inducted: Professional Football Hall of Fame class of 1970.
 Tom Fears, end from the University of California, Los Angeles taken 11th round 103rd overall by the Cleveland Rams.
Inducted: Professional Football Hall of Fame class of 1970.
 Arnie Weinmeister, defensive tackle from Washington taken 17th round 166th overall by the Brooklyn Tigers.
Inducted: Professional Football Hall of Fame class of 1984.

Notable undrafted players

References

External links
 NFL.com – 1945 Draft
 databaseFootball.com – 1945 Draft
 Pro Football Hall of Fame

National Football League Draft
Draft
NFL Draft
NFL Draft
American football in New York City
Sports in Manhattan
Sporting events in New York City
1940s in Manhattan